The 2016–17 Welsh League Cup (known for sponsorship purposes as The Nathaniel MG Cup) was the 25th season of the Welsh Premier League's cup competition, which was established in 1992.

Played under a regionalised, knock-out format, the 2016–17 competition was the third to be held since the tournament was expanded to include clubs from outside the Welsh Premier League. 

As well as the 12 Welsh Premier League clubs from the previous season, the top five qualifying clubs from the northern and southern feeder leagues would enter the tournament, along with a number of wildcard entrants. 

The New Saints reached their ninth final and won the match 4–0, retaining the trophy and securing their eighth title. 

Their opponents were Barry Town United of the southern section of the Welsh football league system's second tier.

The prize fund for the competition was £15,000, with £10,000 for the winners.

First round

Ties were played on 6 & 7 September 2016.

The semi-finalists from the previous season, The New Saints, Denbigh Town, Connah's Quay and Carmarthen Town received a bye to the second round.

|-

|}

Second round

Ties were played on 4 & 5 October 2016.

|-

|}

Quarter-finals

Ties were played on 25 & 26 October 2016.

|-

|}

Semi-finals

Ties were played on 8 & 22 November 2016 respectively. 

The second semi-final was originally played on 15 November, only to be abandoned due to heavy fog with the score at 2–2.

|-

|}

Final

The match was played on Saturday 21 January 2017 at Cyncoed Stadium, Cardiff and was the first time the Welsh capital city had hosted the final.

The tie was broadcast live on S4C.

External links

Welsh League Cup seasons
League Cup
Wales